Cotyclytus peruvianus is a species of beetle in the family Cerambycidae. It was described by Schmid in 2009.

References

Cotyclytus
Beetles described in 2009